These are lists of UK tanks to enable cross-referencing between the design names and the service names.

General Staff numbers
This is a list of UK tanks up to the end of the Second World War that received designations starting with the letter "A" - these would be designs requested by the General Staff to meet specifications issued, as opposed to private venture designs submitted by manufacturers to the General Staff

*Did not enter service

Alphabetical lists
Includes the C names
 Caernarvon
 Centurion
 Challenger
 Challenger 1
 Challenger 2
Challenger 3 
 Charioteer
 Chieftain
 Churchill
 Comet
 Conqueror
Contentious
 Conway
 Covenanter
 Cromwell
 Crusader
 Light Tank Mk VI
 Matilda I
 Matilda II
 Medium Tank A/T 1 - an amphibious tank prototype
 TOG 1
 TOG 2
 Valentine

See also

 List of FV series military vehicles - Covers post-1945 UK tanks with other vehicles
 British armoured fighting vehicle production during World War II
 Light tanks of the United Kingdom

References

01
United Kingdom
United Kingdom
Tanks